The 1928 National Challenge Cup was the annual open cup held by the United States Football Association now known as the Lamar Hunt U.S. Open Cup.

Eastern Division

Western Division

Final

References

U.S. Open Cup
Nat
New York Nationals (ASL)